Jean Wiener (or Wiéner) (19 March 1896, 14th arrondissement of Paris – 8 June 1982, Paris) was a French pianist and composer.

Life 
Wiener was trained at the Conservatoire de Paris, where he studied alongside Darius Milhaud, and worked with Erik Satie. He then embarked on a career as concert impresario, composer and pianist. He was the house pianist at the Gaya bar, and later at Le Boeuf sur le Toit. In 1924, a chance encounter with Clement Doucet (who succeeded him at Le Boeuf) brought him into the world of popular music. Already a jazz enthusiast, Wiener found fame with Doucet in the music hall s of Europe as a piano duo, under the name "Wiener et Doucet" in which they performed classical music, hot dance and jazz. The two friends recorded many duos between 1925 and 1937. After the end of the war in 1945, Wiener devoted himself fully to composition, notably film music (working on more than 300), as well as the opening theme music for ORTF's film history program "History speechless" (History without words).

He was of some significance in the promotion of new music, both by his friends in the Les Six (Milhaud, Poulenc, etc.), and by composers such as Schoenberg, Berg and Webern. His compositions involve the use of jazz informed by French wit and elegance.

His daughter, Elizabeth Wiener, is an actress, singer and singer-songwriter.

Jean Wiener published his memoirs in 1978 as Allegro Appassionato.

Compositions

Concert and chamber works
Wiener composed a number of concertos which included a Concerto Franco-Americain notable for its influences of jazz, a concerto that he described as Concert Pour Orchestre Et Un Piano Principal (concerto for orchestra and a principal piano), and a concerto for accordion.
 
His chamber music includes a sonata for cello and piano. He set a selection of Robert Desnos' Chantefables for voice and piano.

Solo piano music

His music for solo piano includes

Sonatine Syncopée (1921)	
Trois Mouvements De Musique Pour Le Piano (1980)	
Sonate N°1 (1925)	
2ème Sonatine (1928)
Quatre petits pièces Radio (1947)
Polka, Java and Tango (1957)
Sonate Sans Nom (1973)	
Sonate "Démodée" (1974)	
Touchez Pas Au Grisbi	
Chicken Reel (Histoire Sans Parole)
Pour Pierre Cornevin (1981)	
Trois moments de musique (1981)

Film scores

1920s 
La Femme de nulle part (1922)

1930s 
 Buridan's Donkey (1932)
 The Man with the Hispano (1933)
Une Vie perdue (1933)
Knock ou le triomphe de la médecine (1933)
Le Paquebot Tenacity (1934)
Runaway Ladies (1934)
Les Affaires publiques (1934)
Le Voyage imprévu (1934)
 L'Aventurier (1934)
Maria Chapdelaine (1934)
Le Clown Bux (1935)
Quand minuit sonnera (1935)
La Bandera (1935)
L'Équipage (1935)
L'Homme sans cœur (1936)
Le Crime de Monsieur Lange (1936)
La Garçonne (1936)
Klokslag twaalf (1936)
Les Bas-fonds (1936)
Vive la vie (1937)
La Femme du bout du monde (1937)
 The Man of the Hour (1937)
 Nuits de feu (1937)
De Man zonder hart (1937)
Le Dernier tournant (1939)

1940s 
 Cristobal's Gold (1940)
L'Épouvantail (1943)
Les Passagers de la Grande Ourse (1943)
Untel père et fils (1943)
 Strange Inheritance (1943, non-crédité)
Madame et le mort (1943)
Le Voleur de paratonnerres (1944)
 Father Goriot (1945)
 Girl with Grey Eyes (1945)
 The Captain (1946)
 Patrie (1946)
Impasse (1946)
 Once is Enough (1946)
Macadam (1946)
Panic (1946)
Pour une nuit d'amour (1947)
Le Diable souffle (1947)
 Counter Investigation (1947)
Les Frères Bouquinquant (1948)
La Carcasse et le tord-cou (1948)
Le Point du Jour (1949)
Rendez-vous de juillet (1949)
 The Perfume of the Lady in Black (1949)

1950s 
Maître après Dieu (1951)
Ein Lächeln in Sturm (1951)
Sous le ciel de Paris (1951)
Les Poussières (1953)
Je suis un mouchard (1953)
Paris mon copain (1954)
Paris (1954)
Station 307 (1954)
Touchez pas au grisbi (1954)
La Rafle est pour ce soir (1954)
Futures vedettes, directed by Marc Allégret, (1955), composer and actor (playing a piano teacher)
Le Rendez-vous des quais (1955)
Le Comte de Monte-Cristo (1954)
La Soupe à la grimace (1955)
Sur le banc (1955)
Deadlier Than the Male (1956)
La Vie est belle (1956)
Les Lumières du soir (1956)
Notre-Dame – Cathédrale de Paris (1957)
Pot-Bouille (1957)
Le Septième ciel (1958)
Neither Seen Nor Recognized (1958)
Be Beautiful But Shut Up (1958)
The Female (1959)
La Création du monde (1959)
An Angel on Wheels (1959)
Arrêtez le massacre (1959)

1960s 
 The Nabob Affair (1960)
La Revenante (1960)
Pantalaskas (1960)
Les Bras de la nuit (1961)
 (1961)Quatre-vingt-treize (1962, TV)Le Match (1964, TV)Our Agent Tiger (1965)Merlusse (1965, TV)A la belle étoile (1966)Au Hasard Balthazar (1966)Mouchette (1967)Le Golem (1967, TV)Benjamin (1968)A Gentle Woman (1969) 1970s 
Reportages sur un squelette ou Masques et bergamasques (1970, TV)The Demise of Father Mouret (1970)The Little Theatre of Jean Renoir (1970, TV)La Cavale (1971)Les Gens de Mogador (1972, TV)Féminin-féminin (1973)Les Roses de Manara (1976, TV)Duelle (1976)Inutile d'envoyer la photo (1977) 1980s 
Square X (1981)Lettres d'amour en Somalie (1982)Le Crime d'amour (1982) Stage works le village blanc ou Olive chez les nègres'' (1926 opera)

References

External links 
 
 Jean Wiener page at Discogs

1896 births
1982 deaths
French film score composers
French male film score composers
20th-century French male classical pianists
Classical piano duos
French opera composers
Male opera composers
Musicians from Paris
Conservatoire de Paris alumni
20th-century French composers